Kim Basinger is an American actress who made her television debut as Sheila in "Night Train to Dallas", an episode of the action/adventure drama series Gemini Man that aired on NBC in 1976. She starred in two canceled series as well as several made-for-TV films, including a remake of From Here to Eternity (1979). Her feature film debut was in 1981 drama Hard Country. Basinger came to prominence playing Bond girl Domino Petachi in the 1983 film Never Say Never Again, opposite Sean Connery, and went on to receive a Golden Globe nomination for her role as Memo Paris in The Natural (1984). She also starred as Elizabeth in the controversial erotic romantic drama 9½ Weeks (1986) with Mickey Rourke, as the title character in Nadine with Jeff Bridges (1987) and as Vicki Vale in Tim Burton's blockbuster Batman (1989), which remains the highest-grossing film of her career.

In 1991, she played a glamorous singer in the comedy The Marrying Man alongside her future husband, Alec Baldwin. They then both starred in the remake The Getaway in 1994. She won the Academy Award for Best Supporting Actress for her performance as Lynn Bracken in the 1997 film L.A. Confidential; as well as, the Golden Globe for Best Supporting Actress and the SAG Award for Best Supporting Actress.

She played the role of Kuki Gallmann, an Italian who moved to Kenya to start a new life, in the 2000 film I Dreamed of Africa. Her other films include 8 Mile (2002), The Door in the Floor (2004), Cellular (2004), and The Nice Guys (2016).

Film

Television

Music videos

See also
 List of awards and nominations received by Kim Basinger

References

External links
 
 
 
 

Actress filmographies
American filmographies